Raspberry Software is a software company based near Ipswich in Suffolk, England which in the past offered support for legacy applications and currently  develops software for mobile devices. The company has been quite successful, winning the Anglian Business Award 2005 for Technology, after just a year in business.

The company was formed around the time of the Business Objects acquisition of Crystal Decisions in 2004 to take over support of the Holos product line which has now ceased. The directors of Raspberry Software are all former employees of Crystal Decisions.

Raspberry Software currently collaborate with iansyst Ltd on the joint venture Mobispeech, developing a piece of mobile learning software called CapturaTalk.

References

Pocket PC software
Software companies of the United Kingdom
Computer companies of the United Kingdom
Companies based in Suffolk